Haruna Rone Jammeh (born 2 June 1991) is a Gambian football player who plays for Hungarian club Szeged-Csanád.

Career 
Jammeh started his career with Samger FC. In the summer of 2009, he left Gambia and started his European career in Hungary, in the reserve team of Budapest Honvéd FC and played for them in 26 Nemzeti Bajnokság II games and scored three goals. After two years, he left the club and signed with Labdarúgó NB II side Kaposvári Rákóczi FC.

On 15 August 2014, Haruna signed with Pápa on a contract until 31 July 2015.

Notes

1991 births
Living people
Gambian footballers
The Gambia youth international footballers
Association football forwards
Budapest Honvéd FC II players
Kaposvári Rákóczi FC players
Lombard-Pápa TFC footballers
NK Koprivnica players
Szeged-Csanád Grosics Akadémia footballers
Nemzeti Bajnokság II players
Nemzeti Bajnokság I players
Gambian expatriate footballers
Expatriate footballers in Hungary
Gambian expatriate sportspeople in Hungary
Expatriate footballers in Croatia
Gambian expatriate sportspeople in Croatia